Begonia thaipingensis is a species of is a species of plant in the family Begoniaceae.It is endemic to Malaysia.

References 

thaspingensis